WRES-LP (100.7 FM) is a non-commercial low-power FM (LPFM) radio station located in Asheville, North Carolina, that features a mixture of Urban Contemporary, Jazz, Gospel, and news and information targeted to the area's African-American population. The station is licensed by the Federal Communications Commission (FCC) to broadcast with an effective radiated power (ERP) of 0.094 kW.

History
WRES signed on August 26, 2004. The station is owned by the Empowerment Resource Center of Asheville & Buncombe Co. Inc.

External links
 WRES-LP official website
 

African-American history of North Carolina
RES-LP
RES-LP
Jazz radio stations in the United States
Urban contemporary radio stations in the United States
Radio stations established in 2004